Oleksiy Oleksandrovych Seniuk (24 December 1974 – 27 February 2022) was a Ukrainian veteran of the Russo-Ukrainian War. He was killed by Russian Armed Forces in the Siege of Chernihiv on 27 February 2022 during the Russian invasion of Ukraine. He was posthumously awarded the Order of Gold Star.

Early life 
Oleksiy Seniuk was born on 24 December 1974 in the village of Telizhyntsi (currently part of Tetiiv hromada) Bila Tserkva Raion of Kyiv Oblast. After finishing school, he worked as a builder.

Military career 
He did his 18 month mandatory conscription service during 1990s.

When War in Donbas began in 2014, Oleksiy joined the army, as a volunteer at first. Later he signed a contract and became a soldier in 3rd Company 1st Tank Brigade. He took part in multiple battles operating T-64BV and T-64BM "Bulat" tanks. In 2016, for his courage and heroism Oleksiy was awarded Order for Courage III degree. In November 2016, after returning from ATO Zone, he visited No.29 school and Kharkiv National University of Internal Affairs to share his memories and experiences during combat. As he was promoted, he served as a tank commander. His call sign was Puma.

When Russian invasion of Ukraine began on 24 February, Oleksiy held the rank of Chief sergeant and together with his unit was tasked with defending city of Chernihiv. In 3 days of heavy fighting he destroyed 2 Russian BMP's. Oleksiy also managed to capture an enemy T-72 main battle tank. On 26 February, Oleksiy together with other soldiers from 1st Tank Brigade, was defending outskirts of Chernihiv. They were positioned in vicinity of Epicentr K shopping center. Next day, enemy hit Ukrainian positions near the center, with a rocket. Soon after, enemy began an artillery barrage of those same positions using 152mm caliber. Oleksiy's friend Lieutenant Colonel Artem Linkov was sustained an injury to the head. Artem witnessed the death of his friend Oleksiy. Artillery shells hit Oleksiy's T-64. He screamed that he was burning. Tanks rounds began to cook off, causing Oleksiy's body to be ejected from the tank. It was first reported in March that Oleksiy was killed during an airstrike. Oleksiy died on the birthday of one of his daughters. Because of heavy fighting during Siege of Chernihiv, his body was only recovered 45 days after his death.

Oleksiy was buried on 12 April 2022 in Nosivka. He is survived by his wife Iryna and 2 daughters, Angelina and Daniella.

Awards 
 The title of "Hero of Ukraine" with the deigning Order of the Golden Star (2 March 2022, posthumously) for personal courage and heroism shown in defending the state sovereignty and territorial integrity of Ukraine, loyalty to the military oath.
 Order for Courage III degree (2 December 2016) for personal contribution to strengthening the defense capabilities of Ukrainian state, courage, dedication and high professionalism, shown during military service, and on the occasion of the Day of the Armed Forces of Ukraine.

Posthumous honors
To honor his heroism, Chernihiv working group of the city council on renaming proposed to rename one of the streets to Oleksiy Seniuk street, in June 2022. Chernihiv city website listed Kurs'ka Street as the street to be renamed. On 9 February 2023, Chernihiv City Council released a list streets which they plan to rename. Hrybojedova street will become Oleksiy Seniuk street. Current street is named for Alexander Griboyedov, a Russian diplomat, playwright, poet, and composer. Hrybojedova street was renamed Oleksiy Seniuk street by Chernihiv City Council on 9 February 2023.

References

Sources 

1974 births
2022 deaths
Ukrainian military personnel killed in the 2022 Russian invasion of Ukraine
Deaths by airstrike during the 2022 Russian invasion of Ukraine
Recipients of the Order For Courage, 3rd class
Recipients of the title of Hero of Ukraine
Recipients of the Order of Gold Star (Ukraine)
People from Kyiv Oblast
Tank commanders